The industrialization of Sweden began during the second half of the nineteenth century.  The industrial breakthrough occurred in the 1870s during the international boom period, and it carried on through the decades in response to the growing demand of the home market. By the end of this period, the first multinational companies based on advanced technology had emerged.

During the early phase of World War I in which Sweden remained neutral, the country benefited from increasing demand. However, with the German submarine war, Sweden was cut off from its markets, which led to a severe economic downturn. Between the world wars, major Swedish exports were steel, ball-bearings, wood pulp, and matches. Prosperity after World War II provided the foundations for the social welfare policies characteristic of modern Sweden.

Foreign policy concerns in the 1930s centred on Soviet and German expansionism, which stimulated abortive efforts at Nordic defence co-operation.

In 2016, the Swedish government reported that the industrial and industrial-services sectors accounted for 77 per cent of the country's exports, equivalent to almost 50 per cent of the total gross domestic product (GDP).

Communications

The mainline railways, built and owned by the State, were of major importance for the development of Swedish industry and economy in general.

The two first main line railways, were the Southern Main Line, stretching from Stockholm to Malmö in the south, and the Western Main Line, from Stockholm to Gothenburg on the west coast. They were completed between 1860 and 1864. The Northern railways (East Coast Line, Northern Main Line & Main Line Through Upper Norrland) runs parallel to the Baltic coast up to Boden, in northern Sweden, and was finished in 1894. The Inland Line runs through the central parts of northern Sweden and was built between 1908 and 1937.

The construction of the early main lines provided a fast and safe connection from the mines in the north to the rest of Sweden. It also facilitated business (and private) travel, that had earlier required horse-driven carriages.

The Iron Ore Line (not a main line), from Luleå to Narvik in Norway, provided a highly efficient transportation linkage from the iron ores near Kiruna and Gällivare to harbours on both the Atlantic and the Baltic coasts. The sections of the Iron Ore Line were completed in stages between 1888 and 1903.

See also
Politics of Sweden
Economy of Sweden
Nordic Council
Scandinavia
Scandinavian defense union
Foreign relations of Sweden

References 

19th century in Sweden
Economic history of Sweden
Sweden